Graeme Sherman (born 25 December 1937) is an Australian water polo player. He competed in the men's tournament at the 1960 Summer Olympics.

References

1937 births
Living people
Australian male water polo players
Olympic water polo players of Australia
Water polo players at the 1960 Summer Olympics